Right Place, Right Time may refer to:

 "Right Place, Right Time" (How I Met Your Mother), an episode of How I Met Your Mother
 Right Place Right Time (album), an album by Olly Murs
 "Right Place Right Time" (song), its title track

See also
 Right Place, Wrong Time (disambiguation)
 Wrong Place, Right Time, an album by Haymaker
 "Wrong Place, Wrong Time", song by Mark Chesnutt